Tandaga may refer to:

Tandaga, Bazèga, Burkina Faso
Tandaga, Ganzourgou, Burkina Faso